Highway to Hell is a 1992 American B horror comedy film directed by Ate de Jong and starring Chad Lowe, Kristy Swanson and Patrick Bergin. It was written by Brian Helgeland. The film tells the story of Charlie Sykes (Lowe) and his girlfriend Rachel Clark (Swanson), who is kidnapped by a demon and taken to Hell to become one of Satan's brides, while Charlie must travel to the other dimension to rescue her.

The film features cameo appearances by Lita Ford, Gilbert Gottfried, actor Ben Stiller, his sister Amy Stiller and their parents, Jerry Stiller and Anne Meara. In 2019, Gottfried reprised his role as Adolf Hitler from the film in the comedy television series Historical Roasts.

Synopsis 

Charlie Sykes and Rachel Clark are a young all-American couple who decide to run away and elope in Las Vegas. On the road to Vegas, they ignore the warning by the local gas station attendant, Sam. They take an abandoned backroad where Rachel is kidnapped by a zombie Hell Cop. The kidnapper takes her to hell. Charlie returns to Sam, and Sam explains what the Hellcop is and how to save her. Sam then gives Charlie a shotgun with special ammo and a car that holds a special attribute. After a few attempts, Charlie passes through the portal to hell, an expansive desert with buildings scattered about.

On the highway, Charlie meets other dead people that live in Hell and even a motorcycle gang. The gang is led by the rebel Royce. Charlie manages to catch up to Hell Cop, but his car gets shot up during the chase and becomes disabled. His car is then taken by the repair man Beezle, who is able to fix the car. Charlie continues his pursuit.

Charlie eventually finds out that Beezle's kid assistant Adam had sneaked into the car, wanting to help him find Rachel and keep his dog Ben company. Adam tells him that Hell Cop killed his family. The Cop took him to hell and gave him to Beezle. Charlie promises to bring him back with him.

Charlie eventually tracks down Hell Cop and Rachel at a nightclub/casino. He tries to free Rachel, but Hell Cop grabs Charlie's shotgun. The Cop fatally shoots Charlie before they both leave. Fortunately, Beezle arrives and secures a promise from Adam to come back with him. Beezle uses his repair powers to save Charlie, allowing him to continue his pursuit.

Charlie decides to try a shortcut but is warned against it by Clara. Clara is Royce's girlfriend and was previously Sam's girlfriend. One of her decisions forced her to spend eternity in hell. Charlie proceeds to defeat Hell Cop and saves Rachel, who is sexually aggressive towards him. He finds out from her reflection that this "Rachel" is a demon in disguise. He realizes that he was lured into a trap. After defeating the demon, Charlie heads back on the highway. He makes it to the outskirts of Hell City.

With his dog Ben distracting Cerberus, Charlie convinces Charon to give him a ride over the River Styx to the city. Charlie is able to sneak his way around and make it to Rachel. Satan then appears, wanting Rachel as a bride. Since Charlie went through all that trouble, Satan decides to let them go. But when Charlie looks back, a large group of minions appear. The young couple manages to break into Hell Cop's car. They use its power to break through the wall and jump over the river to their car.

When he goes back to Beezle's place to get Adam, his repair shop had become a mansion. Beezle comes out, revealing that he is actually Satan. He refuses to allow Charlie to take Adam. Charlie proposes a deal: a race against Hell Cop. If he loses, both Rachel and Adam would stay.

As the race begins, Royce drives up to Charlie, demanding to be let inside. He wants to return to the real world. Charlie refuses, and Royce responds by trying to stab Adam. Clara covers his eyes, causing both to crash into a ravine. Just as Hell Cop is about to disable Charlie's car, Rachel finds a switch which releases nitro. It propels their car through the portal, winning the race. However, Hell Cop follows them, seeking revenge. As he is about to kill Charlie, Rachel shoots Hell Cop in his shades, causing him to blow up.

Cast 
 Chad Lowe as Charlie Sykes 
 Patrick Bergin as Beezle
 Kristy Swanson as Rachel Clark
 Jarrett Lennon as Adam
 Adam Storke as Royce
 Pamela Gidley as Clara
 C.J. Graham as Sgt. Bedlam, Hellcop
 Richard Farnsworth as Sam
 Lita Ford as The Hitchhiker
 Gilbert Gottfried as Hitler
 Anne Meara as Medea, Waitress in Pluto's
 Amy Stiller as Cleopatra
 Ben Stiller as Pluto's Cook/Attila 
 Jerry Stiller as The Desk Cop
 Be Deckard as Dentist, Royce's Gang
 Michael Reid MacKay as Rachel Demon
 Kevin Peter Hall as Charon

Production 
The film was shot in Phoenix and Page, Arizona. Antelope Canyon was also a location. Parts of the film were also shot at Glen Canyon in Utah.

Release 
Completed in 1989, Hemdale shelved the film for over 2 years before finally giving it a limited release. It was released to home video on August 21, 1992 and on DVD and Blu-ray on February 2, 2016.

Reception 
Kevin Thomas of the Los Angeles Times wrote: "Although ambitious, amusing and even romantic, replete with lots of striking sets and jazzy special effects, its humor is not sophisticated enough to attract the wide audiences of a Beetlejuice".  Michael Dare of Billboard called it "smart, witty, and incredibly imaginative". TV Guide rated it 2/5 stars and wrote: "Highway to Hell is no masterpiece, but it is a genuine video find". Todd Rigney of Beyond Hollywood called it a "deliriously enjoyable satanic road trip" film that is "fun if you approach it in the right frame of mind". HorrorNews.Net called it "one of the greatest campy horror films to never arrive on DVD".

Highway to Hell has since developed a cult following.

References

External links 
 
 
 

1992 films
1992 comedy films
1992 horror films
1990s comedy horror films
American comedy horror films
American fantasy comedy films
American independent films
American satirical films
The Devil in film
American supernatural horror films
American road movies
Films about kidnapping
Films set in hell
Films shot in Utah
Films shot in Arizona
Films with screenplays by Brian Helgeland
1990s English-language films
Films directed by Ate de Jong
1990s American films